Gharibabad-e Allah Dad (also Romanized as Gharībābād-e Allah Dād; also known as Moḩammadābād; also known as Gharībābād) is a village in Nazil Rural District, Nukabad District, Khash County, Sistan and Baluchestan Province, Iran. At the 2006 census, its population was 39, in 12 families.

References 

Populated places in Khash County